NGC 139 is a barred spiral galaxy in the constellation Pisces. It was discovered on August 29, 1864, by the German astronomer Albert Marth.

References

External links
 

Astronomical objects discovered in 1864
Pisces (constellation)
001900
NGC 0139
0139